Old Landing is an unincorporated community in Lee County, Kentucky, United States.

According to tradition, the community was named for a timber raft landing at the original town site. The post office closed in 1994.

References

Unincorporated communities in Lee County, Kentucky
Unincorporated communities in Kentucky